The 1939 Oklahoma A&M Cowboys football team represented Oklahoma A&M College in the 1939 college football season. This was the 39th year of football at A&M and the first under Jim Lookabaugh. The Cowboys played their home games at Lewis Field in Stillwater, Oklahoma. They finished the season 5–4–1, 3–1 in the Missouri Valley Conference.

Schedule

After the season

The 1940 NFL Draft took place on December 9, 1939 at the Schroeder Hotel in Milwaukee. The following Oklahoma State player was selected during the draft.

References

Oklahoma AandM
Oklahoma State Cowboys football seasons
Oklahoma AandM